Sign of the Hammer is the fourth studio album by the American heavy metal band Manowar, released in 1984 on 10/Virgin Records.

Reception 
In 2005, Sign of the Hammer was ranked number 418 in Rock Hard magazine's book The 500 Greatest Rock & Metal Albums of All Time.

Track listing 
All songs written by Joey DeMaio, except where noted.

Song information 
"Guyana (Cult of the Damned)" is a song about the 1978 mass suicide led by Jim Jones of the Peoples Temple group, at Jonestown, northwestern Guyana.
"Thor (The Powerhead)" is about the Norse God Thor (as the name suggests), destroying the evil of the world and the Giants (enemies of the Gods) as well. The song often brings about the Ragnarök, with "live to fight on that final day" stated many times. The Norse people believed that at the end of the world the Gods and the Giants would battle for control. It is foreseen that the Gods would lose, and many of their deaths have been foretold before the battle. Regardless, the Gods still will fight on the final day for the right to control Earth. This song has been covered by symphonic metal band Therion on the album Crowning of Atlantis.

Personnel

Manowar 
Eric Adams – vocals
Ross the Boss – guitars, keyboards
Joey DeMaio – bass, bass pedals
Scott Columbus – drums, percussion

Production 
Jack Richardson – producer
Tony Platt – producer on track 5, mixing
Arun Chakraverty – mastering
Rian Hughes – sleeve design
Lucifer Burns, Anthony "Chio" Chiofalo, Armand "The Arm" Biondi – technicians
Jay Bergen – management (representation)

Charts

References 

1984 albums
Manowar albums
Virgin Records albums
Albums produced by Jack Richardson (record producer)